A Land of Pure Delight: William Billings Anthems and Fuging Tunes is a 1992 album of hymns, anthems and songs written by William Billings performed by the American vocal ensemble His Majestie's Clerkes conducted by Paul Hillier on Harmonia Mundi Records as a sequel to their earlier Ghoostly Psalms: Anglo-American Psalmody 1550–1800.Historical Performance: The Journal of Early Music America 1993 "William Billings, "A Land of Pure Delight": Anthems and Fuging Tunes. His Majestie's Clerkes, Paul Hillier, director. Harmonia Mundi France HMU 907048. "

The album was favourably reviewed by the Chicago Tribune as sung with "impeccable musicianship, full-throated tone, warmth and security of blend and expressive intelligence", and listed in the Penguin Guide to Compact Discs. The Digital Audio Music List reviewed the audio quality of the album as "technically exceptional in every positive way".

Track listing
 O Praise the Lord of Heaven Is Any Afflicted Emmaus Africa Funeral Anthem: Samuel the Priest Shiloh Jordan I Am the Rose of Sharon Euroclydon Hear My Pray'r Rutland David's Lamentation As the Hart Panteth Creation Brookfield Easter Anthem: The Lord Is Ris'n Indeed''

References

1992 classical albums